Concerto for Clarinet & Combo (full title Premiere Recording of Concerto for Clarinet & Combo by Bill Smith, with the Composer on Clarinet, & Bags' Groove, Sophisticated Rabbit, My Old Flame) is an album by drummer Shelly Manne's group Shelly Manne & His Men recorded at sessions in 1955 and 1957 and released on the Contemporary label.

Reception

The AllMusic review by Scott Yanow states: "All in all, this is a well-balanced and continually interesting set that deserves to be reissued".

Track listing
 "Concerto For Clarinet & Combo: First Movement" (Bill Smith) - 5:14
 "Concerto For Clarinet & Combo: Second Movement" (Smith) - 8:27
 "Concerto For Clarinet & Combo: Third Movement" (Smith) - 6:39
 "Sophisticated Rabbit" (Shelly Manne) - 3:22
 "My Old Flame" (Arthur Johnston, Sam Coslow) - 5:54
 "Bags' Groove" (Milt Jackson) - 10:52	  
Recorded at Contemporary's studio in Los Angeles on December 6, 1955 (tracks 5 & 6), July 24 1957 (tracks 1-3), and July 25, 1957 (track 4).

Personnel
Shelly Manne - drums
Stu Williamson - trumpet, valve trombone
Bob Enevoldsen - valve trombone (tracks 1-3)
Vincent DeRosa - French horn (tracks 1-3)
Bill Smith - clarinet (tracks 1-3)
Charlie Mariano - alto saxophone (tracks 1-4)
Bill Holman - tenor saxophone, baritone saxophone (tracks 1-3, 5 & 6)
Jack Montrose - tenor saxophone (tracks 1-3)
Russ Freeman - piano
Leroy Vinnegar (tracks 5 & 6), Monty Budwig (tracks 1-4) - bass

References

External links
 

1957 albums
Contemporary Records albums
Shelly Manne albums